Rankin MacDougal Gibson (1916-2001) was a Democratic lawyer from Missouri who settled in Ohio. He occupied positions in the administration of Governor Michael DiSalle, and was appointed to the Ohio Supreme Court in 1963 and 1964.

Rankin Gibson was the son of Alexander and Murle Fletcher Gibson. He was born October 9, 1916 in Unionville, Missouri. He attended Northeast Missouri State Teachers College 1934 to 1936, and graduated from the University of Missouri School of Law in 1939. He passed the bar that year and opened a practice in Unionville. In 1940, he began working as an attorney for T.H. Mastin & Co., an insurance company in St. Louis, Missouri.

From 1945 to 1951, Gibson worked for the Veteran's Administration in Des Moines, Iowa, St. Paul, Minnesota, and Washington, D.C. He earned a bachelor of science in law from St. Paul College of Law in 1948 and a master of law from George Washington Law School in 1950. In 1951 he worked for the Wage Stabilization Board as an enforcement and litigation attorney. He also joined the faculty of the University of Toledo College of Law in 1951, working there until 1956. He was admitted to the Ohio bar in 1954.

In 1956, Gibson joined the Toledo, Ohio firm DiSalle, Green, Haddad & Lynch. He moved to Columbus, Ohio in 1959, to serve as assistant to Ohio Governor Michael DiSalle. For 1959 to 1961 he served on the Interstate Cooperation Committee and as chairman of the Governor's Committee on Public Information. He also taught at Franklin University School of Law. He was director of the Ohio Department of Commerce, a member of the Ohio Water Pollution Board, The Civil War Centennial Commission, and the Ohio Housing Board from 1961 to 1962. In 1963, he was named to head the Public Utilities Commission of Ohio.

In 1962, Kingsley A. Taft was elected Chief Justice of the Ohio Supreme Court, starting Jan 1, 1963. This created a vacancy on the court, to which Governor LaSalle appointed Gibson. He was required to run for the unexpired portion of Taft's term in November 1964, and lost to Republican Paul W. Brown.

Beginning in 1965, Gibson returned to private practice with Lucas, Predergast, Albright, Gibson and Newman. In 1972, he was president of the Ohio State Bar Association.

Rankin Gibson married Eloise M. Corns on September 13, 1941. They had two children. He lived in Galloway, Ohio and died on June 4, 2001 at West Jefferson, Ohio.

References

Justices of the Ohio Supreme Court
1916 births
2001 deaths
Ohio Democrats
People from Unionville, Missouri
Truman State University alumni
University of Missouri School of Law alumni
William Mitchell College of Law alumni
George Washington University Law School alumni
Politicians from Toledo, Ohio
Lawyers from Columbus, Ohio
University of Toledo faculty
Franklin University faculty
20th-century American judges
Lawyers from Toledo, Ohio
People from Franklin County, Ohio